Slettningen is a lake in Vang Municipality in Innlandet county, Norway.

See also
List of lakes in Norway

References

Vang, Innlandet
Lakes of Innlandet